The Susquehanna Valley is a region of low-lying lands in the U.S. states of New York, Pennsylvania, and Maryland surrounding the Susquehanna River.

Susquehanna Valley may also refer to:

 Binghamton metropolitan area
 Susquehanna Valley Central School District (which includes Susquehanna Valley High School), commonly referred to as "Susquehanna Valley"
 Harrisburg–Carlisle metropolitan statistical area
 West Branch Susquehanna Valley in Pennsylvania

Susquehanna River
Valleys of New York (state)
Valleys of Pennsylvania